The 2014–15 Indian Federation Cup, also known as the Hero Federation Cup for sponsorship reasons, was the 36th edition of the Federation Cup, the main national football cup competition in India. Ten of the eleven I-League clubs participated in the tournament the season with Bharat FC being the excluded club.

Churchill Brothers were the reigning champions of the Federation Cup, having won the tournament in 2014, however, due to failing to pass the licensing criteria for the I-League, they were unable to defend their title.

All matches including the semi final and final were played in Goa.

The final was played between Dempo and Bengaluru FC on 11 January 2015. Bengaluru FC beat Dempo 2–1 to clinch their maiden Federation Cup title.

Rounds and dates

Teams
On 25 September 2014, it was announced that ten of the eleven I-League clubs would be participating in the Federation Cup, with Bharat FC being the exception. No other teams from other leagues were invited to the tournament.

 Bengaluru FC
 Dempo
 East Bengal
 Mohun Bagan
 Mumbai
 Pune
 Royal Wahingdoh
 Salgaocar
 Shillong Lajong
 Sporting Goa

Venues
The venues for the Federation Cup were also announced on 28 September 2014. Group A matches would be played at the Fatorda Stadium with Group B matches taking place at the Tilak Maidan Stadium. The final and semi-finals would take place at the Fatorda Stadium.

Group stage

Group A

Group B

Knockout stages

Bracket

Semi-finals

Final

Goalscorers
6 Goals:

  Sunil Chhetri (Bengaluru FC)
  Tolgay Özbey (Dempo)

4 Goals:

  Douhou Pierre (Salgaocar)
  Romeo Fernandes (Dempo)

3 Goals:

  Gurjinder Kumar (Salgaocar)
  Jackichand Singh (Royal Wahingdoh)
  Victorino Fernandes (Sporting Goa)

2 Goals:

  Anthony Wolfe (Sporting Goa)
  Dudu Omagbemi (East Bengal)
  Pierre Boya (Mohun Bagan)
  Ryuji Sueoka (Pune)
  Robin Singh (Bengaluru FC)
  Sean Rooney (Bengaluru FC)

1 Goals:

  Anthony D'Souza (Pune) 
  Arata Izumi (Pune)
  Bekay Bewar (Royal Wahingdoh)
  Bikash Jairu (Salgaocar)
  Biswajit Saha (Sporting Goa)
  Clifton Dias (Salgaocar)
  Clifford Miranda (Dempo) 
  Darryl Duffy (Salgaocar)
  Eric Brown (Pune)
  Eugeneson Lyngdoh (Bengaluru FC)
  Francis Kasonde (Salgaocar)
  Jacob Lalrawngbawla (Shillong Lajong)
  Josimar (Mumbai)
  Kingshuk Debnath (Mohun Bagan)
  Lalrammuana (Shillong Lajong)
  Ranti Martins (East Bengal)
  Sampath Kuttymani (Mumbai)
  Shylo Malsawmtluanga (East Bengal)
  Thongkhosiem Haokip (Pune)

Hat-tricks

References

External links
 Section on the All India Football Federation website.

 
2012-13
India
Federation Cup
Sport in Goa